Clavulina humicola is a species of coral fungus in the family Clavulinaceae. It occurs in Guyana.

References

External links

Fungi described in 2005
Fungi of Guyana
humicola